Village Idiot is a 2012 album by Andreas Johnson.

Track listing
(All songs written by Andreas Johnson and Peter Kvint except track 8, which was written by Andreas Johnson alone)

One Day
Lovelight
Stuck
Buzzin'
Paris
One Man Army
My Religion
So Cruel So You
Escape
The Greatest Reward
Amsterdam
Solace

Chart positions

References

External links

2012 albums
Andreas Johnson albums